The 2007 Cleveland Indians season was the 107th season for the franchise. The Indians won the AL Central title for the first time since 2001 on September 23, 2007, with a win over the Oakland Athletics. They played for the American League title before losing to the Boston Red Sox in seven games.

To prepare for 2007, Indians General Manager Mark Shapiro signed relievers Aaron Fultz, Joe Borowski, and Roberto Hernández to fix a bullpen that had the fewest saves (and most blown saves) in 2006. He also traded third baseman Kevin Kouzmanoff for second baseman Josh Barfield. On January 2, Luis Rivas was signed as a free agent with the Cleveland Indians.

Regular season

Season summary
The Indians began the 2007 season on the road in Chicago for a three-game series with the White Sox. The lineup supplied plenty of offense as the Indians won the first two games of the series. Grady Sizemore hit three home runs in the series, but the White Sox won the third game, leaving the Indians with a record of 2–1 as they head home.

However, their home opener, as well as the remainder of a four-game series with the Seattle Mariners, was postponed due to heavy snow. After a discussion about a possible relocation of the following series between the Indians and the Angels to Anaheim, the Indians decided to relocate the three-game series to Miller Park in Milwaukee. The three-game series averaged a surprising 17,498 fans in attendance, and featured several homages to the fact that the film Major League was shot in Milwaukee, including closer Joe Borowski entering the game to "Wild Thing".

In that series, the Indians got a solid outing by CC Sabathia, and although the Angels roughed up the bullpen, closer Joe Borowski held on in the 9th inning to give the Indians a 7–6 victory. Angels' pitcher Joe Saunders dominated the second game, and the Angels won 4–1. In the final game of the series, Travis Hafner hit a 3-run home run in the bottom of the 8th inning to put the Indians ahead 4–2 for a comeback win.

On April 13, the Indians announced they had signed starter Jake Westbrook to a three-year contract extension. Westbrook would have been eligible for free agency at the end of the season.

The Indians came back to Cleveland and played their first official game at Jacobs Field, but lost to the White Sox 6–4. However, the Indians won the next two games with impressive pitching and defense and improved to 6–3 on the season. The three-game series averaged 16,586 fans per game in attendance, a modern-era record for lowest average attendance in a team's first home series of the season.

On April 28, the Indians had a six-game winning streak snapped in part because of a rare scoring decision. The umpires retroactively added a run to the Baltimore Orioles' score three innings after the play had occurred. Manager Eric Wedge immediately appealed the decision to the MLB commissioner's office. The game will remain as originally played, as the commissioner's office has upheld the umpire's decision. The Indians won the following game to end the month of April with a 14–8 record, having won seven of their last eight games.

The Indians continued their fast start into May, with a three-game sweep of the Blue Jays at home. They struggled on the ensuing road trip, however, going 4–6 against the Orioles, Angels, and Athletics, including a game in which the Indians led the Athletics 7–5 going into the bottom of the 9th. The bullpen gave up home runs to Milton Bradley and Jack Cust and went on to lose 10–7.

However, when they returned to Jacobs Field, the Indians got hot again, going 6–1 against the Twins, Reds, and Mariners. After a series loss to the Royals on the road, the Indians swept the contending Tigers at Comerica Park, and went on to finish 19–11 in the month of May.

June began memorably for the Indians, when in the bottom of the 9th inning, they rallied from a 4-run deficit to defeat the Tigers 12–11 in front of a near-capacity crowd at Jacobs Field. Entering interleague play, however, the Indians began to struggle, losing a series on the road to the last place Reds, at home to the Braves and to the last-place Nationals. They had a mediocre 9–9 record in interleague play, but finished the month strong by taking three of four from the Athletics, and sweeping a 4-game set from the Devil Rays, and went 15–11 in June, still in first place over the Detroit Tigers. Named to the All Star team this month were Víctor Martínez, CC Sabathia and Grady Sizemore.

July started with a critical away series against the Tigers with first place on the line. Starting the series with a two-game lead, they won the first game. However, they lost the next two games as well as dropped 2 out of 3 to Toronto to reach the All-Star break 1 game behind Detroit.

The Indians sent 3 players to the 2007 All Star game in San Francisco. CC Sabathia pitched one inning, in which he gave up 1 hit and 0 runs. Grady Sizemore went 0–1 with a strikeout and played the both left and center field during the late innings. Victor Martinez came into the game right after Sizemore's at bat to pinch hit for the pitcher, and hit a 2-run homer that gave the A.L. a 5–2 lead in the 8th inning. This home run proved to be the game winner as the American League defeated the National League 5–4.

After the All-Star Break, the Indians went 3–3 on their homestand with the Royals and White Sox. After taking 3 of 4 from the Rangers on the road, Cleveland went into a slump, losing the next three series' at home to the Red Sox, Twins, and Rangers, going 3–7 overall. On July 27, the Indians traded catcher Max Ramirez to the Texas Rangers for OF Kenny Lofton. Lofton played later that night and went 3–5 with 1 RBI.

On the ensuing road trip, Cleveland's play improved, going 5–4 against the Twins and White Sox. When they returned home, however, the Indians went into another slide. They were swept for the second time in the season by the New York Yankees, and fell out of first place. But on the next road trip, Cleveland began to play much better, winning series' against the Devil Rays, Tigers, and Royals. They finished the trip 6–3 and took a two-and-a-half-game lead for the AL Central. A key factor for the Tribe was replacing Josh Barfield at second base with rookie Asdrúbal Cabrera. The Indians pressed their Central Division advantage by sweeping Minnesota at home, beating Seattle at home in a make-up game, and winning the first of a three-game series at home against the White Sox.

Cleveland started September in the middle of a stretch of 23 games in 23 days due to adjustments for the snowed-out games in April. They won the series with the White Sox that started in August two games to one, then, on the road, proceeded to beat Johan Santana of the Twins for the fifth time in the same season. The Indians went on to sweep the Twins, then split a four-game series in Anaheim against the Angels and take two out of three from the White Sox in Chicago, making the Tribe 7–3 on the road trip and 17–6 over the long stretch. The Indians took two of three from Kansas City to start the last home stand of the regular season, winning the first game on a ninth-inning walk-off home run by Casey Blake. The last series of the year against the Tigers started off dramatically with a come from behind win in extra innings, again with a walk-off home run by Casey Blake. The Indians would go on to sweep the series and bring their lead in the Central Division up to  games once again, essentially ending Detroit's hopes of a playoff berth. The Indians clinched the Central Division title on September 23, 2007. It was their first playoff berth since 2001. The Indians finished tied with the Boston Red Sox for the best record in Major League Baseball; however, Boston was awarded the #1 seed in American League due to a better head-to-head record (5–2).

Season standings

Record vs. opponents

Roster

Game log

|- style="background-color:#bbffbb"
| 1 || April 2 || @ White Sox || 12–5 || Sabathia (1–0) || Contreras (0–1) || || 38,088 || 1–0
|- style="background-color:#bbffbb"
| 2 || April 4 || @ White Sox || 8–7 || Fultz (1–0) || Thornton (0–1) || Borowski (1) || 26,337 || 2–0
|- style="background-color:#ffbbbb"
| 3 || April 5 || @ White Sox ||4–3 || Jenks (1–0) || Hernández (0–1) || || 24,141|| 2–1
|- style="background-color:#bbbbbb"
|–|| April 6 || Mariners || colspan=5|Postponed (snow) || 2–1
|- style="background-color:#bbbbbb"
|–|| April 7 || Mariners || colspan=5|Postponed (snow) || 2–1
|- style="background-color:#bbbbbb"
|–|| April 8 || Mariners || colspan=5|Postponed (snow) || 2–1
|- style="background-color:#bbbbbb"
|–|| April 9 || Mariners || colspan=5|Postponed (snow) || 2–1
|- style="background-color:#bbffbb"
| 4 || April 10 || Angels* || 7–6 || Sabathia (2–0) || Santana (1–1) || Borowski (2) || 19,031 || 3–1
|- style="background-color:#ffbbbb"
| 5 || April 11 || Angels* || 4–1 || Saunders (1–0) || Westbrook (0–1) || Rodríguez (4) || 16,375 || 3–2
|- style="background-color:#bbffbb"
| 6 || April 12 || Angels* || 4–2 || Fultz (2–0) || Shields (0–1) || Borowski (3) || 17,090 || 4–2
|- style="background-color:#ffbbbb"
| 7 || April 13 || White Sox || 6–4 || Vázquez (2–0) || Carmona (0–1) || Jenks (3)|| 16,789 || 4–3
|- style="background-color:#bbffbb"
| 8 || April 14 || White Sox || 4–0 || Byrd (1–0) || Danks (0–2) || Borowski (4) || 18,082 || 5–3
|- style="background-color:#bbffbb"
| 9 || April 15 || White Sox || 2–1 || Sabathia (3–0) || Contreras (1–2) || Borowski (5) || 14,887 || 6–3
|- style="background-color:#ffbbbb"
| 10 || April 17 || @ Yankees || 10–3 || Wright (1–0) || Westbrook (0–2) || || 38,438 || 6–4
|- style="background-color:#ffbbbb"
| 11 || April 18 || @ Yankees || 9–2 || Igawa (1–0) || Sowers (0–1) || || 41,379 || 6–5
|- style="background-color:#ffbbbb"
| 12 || April 19 || @ Yankees || 8–6 || Henn (1–0) || Borowski (0–1) || || 40,872 || 6–6
|- style="background-color:#bbffbb"
| 13 || April 20 || @ Devil Rays || 4–3 || Hernández (1–1) || Salas (0–1) || Borowski (6) || 13,391 || 7–6
|- style="background-color:#ffbbbb"
| 14 || April 21 || @ Devil Rays || 6–5 || Seo (1–1) || Byrd (1–1) || Reyes (6) || 22,805 || 7–7
|- style="background-color:#bbffbb"
| 15 || April 22 || @ Devil Rays || 6–4 || Mastny (1–0) || Stokes (1–3) || Borowski (7) || 18,131 || 8–7
|- style="background-color:#bbffbb"
| 16 || April 23 || @ Twins || 7–3  || Hernández (2–1) || Crain (0–1) || || 16,067 || 9–7
|- style="background-color:#bbffbb"
| 17 || April 24 || @ Twins || 5–3 || Carmona (1–1) || Santana (3–2) || Borowski (8) || 20,849 || 10–7
|- style="background-color:#bbffbb"
| 18 || April 25 || Rangers || 8–7  || Cabrera (1–0) || Eyre (1–1) || || 13,843 || 11–7
|- style="background-color:#bbffbb"
| 19 || April 26 || Rangers || 9–4 || Byrd (2–1) || Loe (1–1) || || 14,066 || 12–7
|- style="background-color:#bbffbb"
| 20 || April 27 || Orioles || 5–4 || Westbrook (1–2) || Trachsel (1–2) || Borowski (9) || 20,484 || 13–7
|- style="background-color:#ffbbbb"
| 21 || April 28 || Orioles || 7–4 || Walker (1–0) || Cabrera (1–1) || Ray (7) || 25,065 || 13–8
|- style="background-color:#bbffbb"
| 22 || April 29 || Orioles || 6–1 || Carmona (2–1) || Wright (0–3) || || 25,402 || 14–8
|-
| colspan=8 |*At Miller Park in Milwaukee

|- style="background-color:#bbffbb"
| 23 || May 1 || Blue Jays || 12–4 || Sabathia (4–0) || Burnett (2–2) || || 13,389 || 15–8
|- style="background-color:#bbffbb"
| 24 || May 2 || Blue Jays || 7–6  || Mastny (2–0)|| Marcum (1–2) || || 14,163 || 16–8
|- style="background-color:#bbffbb"
| 25 || May 3 || Blue Jays || 6–5 ||Fultz (3–0) || Frasor (1–1) || Borowski (10) || 16,284 || 17–8
|- style="background-color:#ffbbbb"
| 26 || May 4 || @ Orioles || 3–2  || Ray (3–2) || Mastny (2–1) || || 28,575 || 17–9
|- style="background-color:#ffbbbb"
| 27 || May 5 || @ Orioles || 8–2 || Cabrera (2–3) || Sowers (0–2) || || 25,752 || 17–10
|- style="background-color:#bbffbb"
| 28 || May 6 || @ Orioles || 9–6 || Sabathia (5–0) || Burres (0–1) || Borowski (11) || 37,464 || 18–10
|- style="background-color:#bbffbb"
| 29 || May 7 || @ Orioles || 10–1 || Carmona (3–1) || Bradford (0–1) || || 17,944 || 19–10
|- style="background-color:#bbffbb"
| 30 || May 8 || @ Angels || 5–1 || Lee (1–0) || Santana (2–5) || || 41,731 || 20–10
|- style="background-color:#ffbbbb"
| 31 || May 9 || @ Angels || 3–2 || Moseley (3–0) || Cabrera (1–2) || Rodríguez (11) || 40,007 || 20–11
|- style="background-color:#ffbbbb"
| 32 || May 10 || @ Angels || 8–0 || Escobar (4–1) || Sowers (0–3) || || 33,698 || 20–12
|- style="background-color:#ffbbbb"
| 33 || May 11 || @ Athletics || 8–2 || Blanton (4–1) || Sabathia (5–1) || || 20,393 || 20–13
|- style="background-color:#bbffbb"
| 34 || May 12 || @ Athletics || 6–3 || Carmona (4–1) ||Braden (1–2) || Borowski (12) || 22,705 || 21–13
|- style="background-color:#ffbbbb"
| 35 || May 13 || @ Athletics || 10–7 || Witasick (1–0) || Borowski (0–2) || || 24,692 || 21–14
|- style="background-color:#bbffbb"
| 36 || May 15 || Twins ||15–7 || Byrd (3–1) ||Ortiz (3–4)|| ||23,325 || 22–14
|- style="background-color:#bbffbb"
| 37 || May 16 || Twins || 7–1 ||Sabathia (6–1) ||Silva (2–4) || ||17,678 || 23–14
|- style="background-color:#bbffbb"
| 38 || May 17 || Twins ||2–0 ||Carmona (5–1) || Santana (4–4) || ||28,609 ||24–14
|- style="background-color:#bbffbb"
| 39 || May 18 || Reds || 9–4 || Lee (2–0) || Lohse (1–5) || || 34,230 || 25–14
|- style="background-color:#ffbbbb"
| 40 || May 19 || Reds || 10–5 || Belisle (4–3) || Sowers (0–4)|| Weathers (8)|| 35,262 || 25–15
|- style="background-color:#bbffbb"
| 41 || May 20 || Reds || 5–3 || Byrd (4–1) ||Harang (5–2) ||Borowski (13) || 32,524 || 26–15
|- style="background-color:#bbffbb"
| 42 || May 21 || Mariners || 5–2 || Mastny (3–1) || Baek (1–2) || Borowski (14) || 38,645 || 27–15
|- style="background-color:#ffbbbb"
| 43 || May 22 || @ Royals || 4–3 || Greinke (2–4) || Mastny (3–2) || || 19,776 || 27–16
|- style="background-color:#ffbbbb"
| 44 || May 23 || @ Royals || 11–7 || Duckworth (2–3) || Lee (2–1) || || 11,506 || 27–17
|- style="background-color:#bbffbb"
| 45 || May 24 || @ Royals || 10–3 || Sowers (1–4) || de la Rosa (4–4) || || 11,681 || 28–17
|- style="background-color:#bbffbb"
| 46 || May 25 || @ Tigers || 7–4 || Byrd (5–1) || Robertson (4–4) || Borowski (15) || 40,074 || 29–17
|- style="background-color:#bbffbb"
| 47 || May 26 || @ Tigers || 6–3 || Sabathia (7–1) || Grilli (2–2) || Borowski (16) || 40,375 || 30–17
|- style="background-color:#bbffbb"
| 48 || May 27 || @ Tigers || 5–3 || Carmona (6–1) || Maroth (3–2) || Borowski (17) || 40,723 || 31–17
|- style="background-color:#ffbbbb"
| 49 || May 28 || @ Red Sox || 5–3 || Schilling (5–2) || Lee (2–2) || Papelbon (13) || 36,910 || 31–18
|- style="background-color:#ffbbbb"
| 50 || May 29 || @ Red Sox || 4–2 || Beckett (8–0) || Sowers (1–5) || Okajima (4) || 37,076 || 31–19
|- style="background-color:#bbffbb"
| 51 || May 30 || @ Red Sox || 8–4 || Byrd (6–1) || Matsuzaka (7–3) || || 37,091 || 32–19
|- style="background-color:#bbffbb"
| 52 || May 31 || Tigers || 11–5 || Sabathia (8–1) || Verlander (5–2) || || 30,038 || 33–19

|- style="background-color:#bbffbb"
| 53 || June 1 || Tigers || 12–11 || Hernández (1–3) || Jones (1–3) || || 41,365 || 34–19
|- style="background-color:#ffbbbb"
| 54 || June 2 || Tigers || 9–5 || Durbin (5–1) || Lee (2–3) || || 38,254 || 34–20
|- style="background-color:#ffbbbb"
| 55 || June 3 || Tigers || 9–2 || Bonderman (5–0) || Sowers (1–6) || || 30,268 || 34–21
|- style="background-color:#bbffbb"
| 56 || June 5 || Royals || 1–0 || Sabathia (9–1) || de la Rosa (4–6) || || 14,036 || 35–21
|- style="background-color:#ffbbbb"
| 57 || June 6 || Royals || 4–3 || Bannister (2–3) || Byrd (6–2) || Dotel (2) || 17,632 || 35–22
|- style="background-color:#bbffbb"
| 58 || June 7 || Royals || 8–3 || Carmona (7–1) || Pérez (3–6) || || 19,315 || 36–22
|- style="background-color:#ffbbbb"
| 59 || June 8 || @ Reds || 4–3 || Bailey (1–0) || Lee (2–4) || Weathers (12) || 38,696 || 36–23
|- style="background-color:#bbffbb"
| 60 || June 9 || @ Reds || 8–6  || Mastny (4–2) || Santos (1–2) || Borowski (18) || 37,935 || 37–23
|- style="background-color:#ffbbbb"
| 61 || June 10 || @ Reds || 1–0  || McBeth (1–0) || Miller (0–1) || || 30,842 || 37–24
|- style="background-color:#ffbbbb"
| 62 || June 11 || Mariners || 8–7 || Morrow (3–0) || Borowski (0–3) || || 22,325 || 37–25
|- style="background-color:#ffbbbb"
| 63 || June 12 || @ Marlins || 3–0 || Olsen (5–5) || Carmona (7–2) || Gregg (10) || 15,144 || 37–26
|- style="background-color:#bbffbb"
| 64 || June 13 || @ Marlins || 7–3 || Lee (3–4) || Kim (3–3) || || 13,805 || 38–26
|- style="background-color:#bbffbb"
| 65 || June 14 || @ Marlins || 3–2 || Stanford (1–0) || Willis (7–6) || Borowski (19) || 23,811 || 39–26
|- style="background-color:#ffbbbb"
| 66 || June 15 || Braves || 5–4 || Soriano (2–0) || Sabathia (9–2) || Wickman (12) || 34,848 || 39–27
|- style="background-color:#ffbbbb"
| 67 || June 16 || Braves || 6–2 || Smoltz (8–3) || Byrd (6–3) || || 35,153 || 39–28
|- style="background-color:#bbffbb"
| 68 || June 17 || Braves || 5–2 || Carmona (8–2) || Davies (3–6) || Borowski (20) || 33,429  || 40–28
|- style="background-color:#bbffbb"
| 69 || June 18 || Phillies || 10–1 || Lee (3–4) || Hamels (9–3) || || 18,710 || 41–28
|- style="background-color:#ffbbbb"
| 70 || June 19 || Phillies || 9–6 || Kendrick (0–1) || Stanford (1–1) || || 17,371 || 41–29
|- style="background-color:#bbffbb"
| 71 || June 20 || Phillies || 10–6 || Sabathia (10–2) || Lieber (3–6) || || 24,278 || 42–29
|- style="background-color:#ffbbbb"
| 72 || June 22 || @ Nationals || 4–1 || Rivera (2–2) || Carmona (8–3) || Cordero (12) || 24,534 || 42–30
|- style="background-color:#bbffbb"
| 73 || June 23 || @ Nationals || 4–3 || Mastny (5–2) || Cordero (1–2) || Borowski (21) || 32,539 || 43–30
|- style="background-color:#ffbbbb"
| 74 || June 24 || @ Nationals || 3–1 || Simontacchi (5–5) || Westbrook (1–3) || Cordero (13) || 26,413 || 43–31
|- style="background-color:#bbffbb"
| 75 || June 25 || Athletics || 5–2 || Sabathia (11–2) || Gaudin (6–3) || || 17,737 || 44–31
|- style="background-color:#bbffbb"
| 76 || June 26 || Athletics || 8–5 || Betancourt (1–0) || Embree (1–1) || || 18,494 || 45–31
|- style="background-color:#ffbbbb"
| 77 || June 27 || Athletics || 13–2 || DiNardo (3–4) || Carmona (8–4) || || 18,614 || 45–32
|- style="background-color:#bbffbb"
| 78 || June 28 || Athletics || 4–3 || Byrd (7–3) || Flores (0–2) || Borowski (22) || 22,921 || 46–32
|- style="background-color:#bbffbb"
| 79 || June 29 || Devil Rays || 2–1 || Borowski (1–3) || Shawn Camp (0–2) || || 34,557 || 47–32
|- style="background-color:#bbffbb"
| 80 || June 30 || Devil Rays || 8–6 || Sabathia (12–2) || Howell (1–2) || Borowski (23) || 36,726 || 48–32

|- style="background-color:#bbffbb"
| 81 || July 1 || Devil Rays || 3–2 || Lee (5–4) || Shields (6–4) || Borowski (24) || 30,410 || 49–32
|- style="background-color:#bbffbb"
| 82 || July 2 || Devil Rays || 10–2 || Carmona (9–4) || Sonnanstine (1–3) || || 34,372 || 50–32
|- style="background-color:#bbffbb"
| 83 || July 3 || @ Tigers || 5–4 || Mastny (6–2) || Capellán (0–3) || Borowski (25) || 40,741 || 51–32
|- style="background-color:#ffbbbb"
| 84 || July 4 || @ Tigers || 6–4 || Rogers (3–0) || Westbrook (1–4) || Jones (21) || 40,782 || 51–33
|- style="background-color:#ffbbbb"
| 85 || July 5 || @ Tigers || 12–3 || Verlander (10–3) || Sabathia (12–3) || || 40,923 || 51–34
|- style="background-color:#ffbbbb"
| 86 || July 6 || @ Blue Jays || 8–6 || Halladay (10–3) || Lee (5–5) || Accardo (11) || 28,526 || 51–35
|- style="background-color:#bbffbb"
| 87 || July 7 || @ Blue Jays || 9–4 || Carmona (10–4) || Marcum (4–3) || || 25,744 || 52–35
|- style="background-color:#ffbbbb"
| 88 || July 8 || @ Blue Jays || 1–0 || Accardo (2–3) || Byrd (7–4) || || 28,239 || 52–36
|- style="background-color:#bbffbb"
| 89 || July 13 || Royals || 5–4 || Borowski (2–3) || Greinke (4–5) || || 32,624 || 53–36
|- style="background-color:#ffbbbb"
| 90 || July 14 || Royals || 6–5 || Meche (6–6) || Sabathia (12–4) || Dotel (9) || 31,599 || 53–37
|- style="background-color:#bbffbb"
| 91 || July 15 || Royals || 5–3 || Carmona (11–4) || de la Rosa (7–10) || Borowski (26) || 29,657 || 54–37
|- style="background-color:#ffbbbb"
| 92 || July 16 || White Sox || 11–10 || Danks (6–6) || Lee (5–6) || Jenks (25) || 21,460 || 54–38
|- style="background-color:#bbffbb"
| 93 || July 17 || White Sox || 6–5  || Betancourt (2–0) || Day (0–1) || || 21,321 || 55–38
|- style="background-color:#ffbbbb"
| 94 || July 18 || White Sox || 5–1 || Buehrle (7–5) || Westbrook (1–5) || || 29,822 || 55–39
|- style="background-color:#bbffbb"
| 95 || July 19 || @ Rangers || 7–5 || Sabathia (13–4) || Loe (5–8) || Borowski (27) || 28,108 || 56–39
|- style="background-color:#bbffbb"
| 96 || July 20 || @ Rangers || 3–2 || Carmona (12–4) || McCarthy (4–7) || Borowski (28) || 32,103 || 57–39
|- style="background-color:#ffbbbb"
| 97 || July 21 || @ Rangers || 8–5 || Mahay (2–0) || Lee (5–7) || || 44,554 || 57–40
|- style="background-color:#bbffbb"
| 98 || July 22 || @ Rangers || 8–3 || Byrd (8–4) || Tejeda (5–9) || || 27,227 || 58–40
|- style="background-color:#ffbbbb"
| 99 || July 23 || Red Sox || 6–2 || Lester (1–0) || Westbrook (1–6) || Delcarmen (1) || 32,439 || 58–41
|- style="background-color:#ffbbbb"
| 100 || July 24 || Red Sox || 1–0 || Matsuzaka (12–7) || Sabathia (13–5) || Papelbon (23) || 39,339 || 58–42
|- style="background-color:#bbffbb"
| 101 || July 25 || Red Sox || 1–0 || Carmona (13–4)
|| Beckett (13–4) || Borowski (29) || 29,614 || 59–42
|- style="background-color:#ffbbbb"
| 102 || July 26 || Red Sox || 14–9 || Tavárez (6–8) || Lee (5–8) || || 34,286 || 59–43
|- style="background-color:#bbffbb"
| 103 || July 27 || Twins || 10–4 || Byrd (9–4) || Bonser (5–7) || || 37–292 || 60–43
|- style="background-color:#ffbbbb"
| 104 || July 28 || Twins || 3–2 || Neshek (6–1) || Borowski (2–4) || Nathan (21) || 41,203 || 60–44
|- style="background-color:#ffbbbb"
| 105 || July 29 || Twins || 4–1 || Reyes (2–1) || Sabathia (13–6) || Nathan (22) || 37,102 || 60–45
|- style="background-color:#ffbbbb"
| 106 || July 31 || Rangers || 3–1 || McCarthy (5–7) || Carmona (13–5) || Wilson (1) || 21,811 || 60–46

|- style="background-color:#ffbbbb"
| 107 || August 1 || Rangers || 9–6  || Benoit (5–3) || Lewis (0–1) || Wilson (2) || 25,721 || 60–47
|- style="background-color:#bbffbb"
| 108 || August 2 || Rangers || 5–0 || Westbrook (2–6) || Gabbard (4–1) || || 27,250 || 61–47
|- style="background-color:#bbffbb"
| 109 || August 3 || @ Twins || 5–2 || Sabathia (14–6) || Santana (11–9) || Borowski (30) || 31,664 || 62–47
|- style="background-color:#ffbbbb"
| 110 || August 4 || @ Twins || 3–2 || Ortiz (4–4) || Laffey (0–1) || Nathan (25) || 33,663 || 62–48
|- style="background-color:#ffbbbb"
| 111 || August 5 || @ Twins || 1–0 || Baker (6–4) || Carmona (13–6) || Nathan (26) || 38,334 || 62–49
|- style="background-color:#bbffbb"
| 112 || August 6 || @ Twins || 4–0 || Byrd (10–4) || Silva (9–12) || || 28,314 || 63–49
|- style="background-color:#bbffbb"
| 113 || August 7 || @ White Sox || 2–1 || Westbrook (3–6) || Danks (6–9) || Borowski (31) || 32,315 || 64–49
|- style="background-color:#ffbbbb"
| 114 || August 8 || @ White Sox || 6–4  || Contreras (6–14)|| Fultz (3–2) || || 33,147 || 64–50
|- style="background-color:#bbffbb"
| 115 || August 9 || @ White Sox || 7–5 || Laffey (1–1) || Buehrle (9–7) || Borowski (32) || 36,399 || 65–50
|- style="background-color:#ffbbbb"
| 116 || August 10 || Yankees || 6–1 || Hughes (2–1) || Carmona (13–7) || || 41,675 || 65–51
|- style="background-color:#ffbbbb"
| 117 || August 11 || Yankees || 11–2 || Mussina (8–7) || Byrd (10–5) || || 41,977 || 65–52
|- style="background-color:#ffbbbb"
| 118 || August 12 || Yankees || 5–3 || Pettitte (9–7) || Westbrook (3–7) || Rivera (19) || 41,612 || 65–53
|- style="background-color:#ffbbbb"
| 119 || August 14 || Tigers || 6–2  || Rodney (2–5) || Borowski (2–5) || || 37,570 || 65–54
|- style="background-color:#bbffbb"
| 120 || August 15 || Tigers || 5–2 || Carmona (14–7) || Jurrjens (0–1) || Borowski (33) || 39,250 || 66–54
|- style="background-color:#bbffbb"
| 121 || August 17 || @ Devil Rays || 2–1 || Byrd (11–5) || Jackson (3–12) || Borowski (34) || 15,343 || 67–54
|- style="background-color:#bbffbb"
| 122 || August 18 || @ Devil Rays || 8–1 || Westbrook (4–7) || Hammel (1–3) || || 24,397 || 68–54
|- style="background-color:#ffbbbb"
| 123 || August 19 || @ Devil Rays || 4–3  || Dohmann (2–0) || Pérez (0–1) || || 22,328 || 68–55
|- style="background-color:#ffbbbb"
| 124 || August 21 || @ Tigers || 2–1 || Jurrjens (1–1) || Carmona (14–8) || Jones (32) || 42,868 || 68–56
|- style="background-color:#bbffbb"
| 125 || August 22 || @ Tigers || 11–8 || Byrd (12–5) || Verlander (13–5) || Borowski (35) || 40,914 || 69–56
|- style="background-color:#bbffbb"
| 126 || August 23 || @ Tigers || 3–1  || Pérez (1–1) || Zumaya (1–2) || Borowski (36) || 40,946 || 70–56
|- style="background-color:#ffbbbb"
| 127 || August 24 || @ Royals || 2–1 || Bale (1–1) || Sabathia (14–7) || Soria (14) || 25,640 || 70–57
|- style="background-color:#bbffbb"
| 128 || August 25 || @ Royals || 9–4 || Laffey (2–1) || Davies (5–11) || || 23,167 || 71–57
|- style="background-color:#bbffbb"
| 129 || August 26 || @ Royals || 5–3  || Betancourt (3–0) || Peralta (1–3) || Borowski (37) || 18,268 || 72–57
|- style="background-color:#bbffbb"
| 130 || August 27 || Twins || 8–3 || Byrd (13–5) || Silva (10–13) || || 23,178 || 73–57
|- style="background-color:#bbffbb"
| 131 || August 28 || Twins || 6–5 || Westbrook (5–7) || Bonser (6–11) || Borowski (38) || 24,784 || 74–57
|- style="background-color:#bbffbb"
| 132 || August 29 || Twins || 4–3 || Sabathia (15–7) || Santana (14–10) || Borowski (39) || 27,303 || 75–57
|- style="background-color:#bbffbb"
| 133 || August 30 || Mariners || 6–5 || Borowski (3–5) || O'Flaherty (7–1) || || 25,949 || 76–57
|- style="background-color:#bbffbb"
| 134 || August 31 || White Sox || 8–5 || Fultz (4–2) || MacDougal (1–5) || Betancourt (1) || 38,325 || 77–57

|- style="background-color:#bbffbb"
| 135 || September 1 || White Sox || 7–0 || Byrd (14–5) || Vázquez (11–8) || || 41,131 || 78–57
|- style="background-color:#ffbbbb"
| 136 || September 2 || White Sox || 8–0 || Contreras (8–16) || Westbrook (5–8) || || 37,718 || 78–58
|- style="background-color:#bbffbb"
| 137 || September 3 || @ Twins || 5–0 || Sabathia (16–7) || Santana (14–11) || || 24,105 || 79–58
|- style="background-color:#bbffbb"
| 138 || September 4 || @ Twins || 7–5  || Betancourt (4–0) || DePaula (0–1) || Borowski (40) || 16,218 || 80–58
|- style="background-color:#bbffbb"
| 139 || September 5 || @ Twins || 6–2 || Carmona (15–8) || Baker (8–7) || Pérez (1) || 13,977 || 81–58
|- style="background-color:#ffbbbb"
| 140 || September 6 || @ Angels || 10–3 || Escobar (16–7) || Byrd (14–6) || || 41,720 || 81–59
|- style="background-color:#ffbbbb"
| 141 || September 7 || @ Angels || 3–2  || Shields (4–5) || Betancourt (4–1) || || 40,020 || 81–60
|- style="background-color:#bbffbb"
| 142 || September 8 || @ Angels || 6–1 || Sabathia (17–7) || Santana (6–13) || || 43,544 || 82–60
|- style="background-color:#bbffbb"
| 143 || September 9 || @ Angels || 6–2 || Laffey (3–1) || Weaver (11–7) || || 40,037 || 83–60
|- style="background-color:#bbffbb"
| 144 || September 10 || @ White Sox || 6–2 || Carmona (16–8) || Floyd (1–3) || || 30,126 || 84–60
|- style="background-color:#bbffbb"
| 145 || September 11 || @ White Sox || 8–3 || Byrd (15–6) || Broadway (0–1) || || 31,939 || 85–60
|- style="background-color:#ffbbbb"
| 146 || September 12 || @ White Sox || 7–4 || J. Vázquez (12–8) || Westbrook (5–9) || || 23,537 || 85–61
|- style="background-color:#bbffbb"
| 147 || September 14 || Royals || 5–4 || Borowski (4–5) || Riske (1–4) || || 35,230 || 86–61
|- style="background-color:#bbffbb"
| 148 || September 15 || Royals || 6–0 || Carmona (17–8) || Greinke (6–6) || || 32,113 || 87–61
|- style="background-color:#ffbbbb"
| 149 || September 16 || Royals || 4–3 || Buckner (1–1) || Laffey (3–2) || Soria (15) || 30,112 || 87–62
|- style="background-color:#bbffbb"
| 150 || September 17 || Tigers || 6–5  || Betancourt (5–1) || Miner (3–4) || || 28,825 || 88–62
|- style="background-color:#bbffbb"
| 151 || September 18 || Tigers || 7–4 || Lewis (1–1) || Verlander (17–6) || Borowski (41) || 41,103 || 89–62
|- style="background-color:#bbffbb"
| 152 || September 19 || Tigers || 4–2 || Sabathia (18–7) || Robertson (8–12) || Borowski (42) || 32,511 || 90–62
|- style="background-color:#bbffbb"
| 153 || September 21 || Athletics || 4–3 || Carmona (18–8) || Blanton (14–10) || Borowski (43) || 36,016 || 91–62
|- style="background-color:#ffbbbb"
| 154 || September 22 || Athletics || 9–3 || Haren (15–8) || Byrd (15–7) || || 40,663 || 91–63
|- style="background-color:#bbffbb"
| 155 || September 23 || Athletics || 6–2 || Westbrook (6–9) || Braden (1–8) || Betancourt (2) || 40,250 || 92–63
|- style="background-color:#bbffbb"
| 156 || September 25 || @ Mariners || 4–3  || Mastny (7–2) || Morrow (3–4) || Betancourt (3) || 22,200 || 93–63
|- style="background-color:#bbffbb"
| 157 || September 26 || Mariners || 12–4 || Carmona (19–8) || Feierabend (1–6) || || n/a || 94–63
|- style="background-color:#ffbbbb"
| 158 || September 26 || @ Mariners || 3–2  || Putz (5–1) || Fultz (4–3) || || 26,801 || 94–64
|- style="background-color:#ffbbbb"
| 159 || September 27 || @ Mariners || 4–2 || Baek (4–3) || Byrd (15–8) || Sherrill (3) || 21,285 || 94–65
|- style="background-color:#bbffbb"
| 160 || September 28 || @ Royals || 5–3 || Sabathia (19–7) || Davies (7–15) || Borowski (44) || 29,846 || 95–65
|- style="background-color:#ffbbbb"
| 161 || September 29 || @ Royals || 4–3 || Soria (2–3) || Pérez (1–2) || || 24,274 || 95–66
|- style="background-color:#bbffbb"
| 162 || September 30 || @ Royals || 4–2 || Laffey (4–2) || Hochevar (0–1) || Borowski (45) || 19,104 || 96–66

|-
| Legend:       = Win       = Loss       = PostponementBold = Indians team member

Player stats

Batting
Note: G = Games played; AB = At bats; R = Runs scored; H = Hits; 2B = Doubles; 3B = Triples; HR = Home runs; RBI = Runs batted in; AVG = Batting average; SB = Stolen bases

Pitching
Note: W = Wins; L = Losses; ERA = Earned run average; G = Games pitched; GS = Games started; SV = Saves; IP = Innings pitched; H = Hits allowed; R = Runs allowed; ER = Earned runs allowed; BB = Walks allowed; K = Strikeouts

Playoffs

Division Series

Game 1
CC Sabathia matched up against Chien-Ming Wang of the New York Yankees, the Wild Card winner. The Indians won 12–3. Sabathia did not pitch particularly well, but turned in a gritty performance that kept the Tribe in the lead until the offense exploded in the fifth against Wang. They had 4 home runs to set the club record for home runs in a postseason game. The home runs were hit by Asdrúbal Cabrera, Travis Hafner, Victor Martinez, and Ryan Garko.

Game 2
Fausto Carmona and Andy Pettitte had one of the most memorable pitching duels of ALDS history, with Pettitte allowing no runs over  innings and Carmona one run over 9. Cleveland squandered many opportunities to tie or take the lead, eventually tying it in the eighth inning after a walk to Grady Sizemore, followed by a wild pitch, a sacrifice bunt by Asdrúbal Cabrera, and another wild pitch off rookie pitching sensation Joba Chamberlain. The run was controversial as Chamberlain appeared bothered by a swarm of midges. Although TBS sideline reporter Craig Sager reported being told by Cleveland Indians security that they are referred to locally as Canadian Soldiers, the nickname actually refers to the mayfly, which also hatches in swarms, but in June. The Indians won 2–1 in 11 innings on a bases-loaded walk-off single by Hafner.

Game 3
Roger Clemens and Jake Westbrook squared off in the Bronx, with Clemens getting into trouble early. He was relieved ably by Phil Hughes. Westbrook struggled in the middle innings, giving up the lead on a home run by Johnny Damon. The Yankees never looked back and cruised to an 8–4 win.

Game 4
Wang returned on three days' rest to pitch against Paul Byrd, Eric Wedge electing to trust his third best starter (by wins) and save Sabathia for a game five. Byrd returned the trust by allowing just two runs over five innings. Wang was drummed out after only one full inning, pitching to three batters in the second. The Yankees then paraded a number of relievers to the hill, starting with demoted starter Mike Mussina, and chipped away all the way to the ninth inning. But the Yankees couldn't get all the way back and the Indians won 6–4, advancing to the American League Championship Series against the Boston Red Sox.

ALCS

Game 1
Josh Beckett of the Red Sox pitched well and Sabathia didn't, leading Boston to a 10–3 victory and an early 1–0 advantage in the series. Sabathia uncharacteristically walked 5.

Game 2
Curt Schilling squared up against Carmona in a pivotal game in the series. Carmona and reliever Rafael Pérez pitched as poorly as Sabathia the day before, nibbling around the edges and then getting hurt when throwing in hitter's counts. The rest of the Indians realizing this would be important later. Schilling was less than stellar as well, resulting in a see-saw game that was tied after nine. In the tenth inning Tom Mastny shut down the heart of Boston's lineup by throwing strikes, then in the eleventh, the Indians scored 7 runs to win 13–6, tying the series at 1–1.

Game 3
Westbrook matched up against Daisuke Matsuzaka and carried forward the first strike first philosophy of the end of game 2 to keep the Boston bats in check. Matsuzaka gave up a two-run homer to Kenny Lofton and didn't get through the fifth inning. The Indians went on to win 4-2 and to take a 2–1 advantage in the series.

Game 4
Byrd and Tim Wakefield started game 4 in a match-up Byrd said might have been "the slowest-throwing right-handed match-up of all time in the post-season". It was also for four innings one of the best pitched match-ups, with both throwing shutouts. However, Casey Blake homered to start the fifth, on the way to the Indians scoring seven runs in one inning for the second time in the series. Boston hitting three straight solo home runs in the sixth closed the gap slightly but not nearly enough and the Indians won 7–3 to take a commanding 3–1 series lead.

Game 5
Sabathia matched up again with Beckett and while he pitched better than the first game, the Red Sox once again had their way with him and sent the Indians down to defeat 7–1, keeping Boston alive in the series.

Game 6
Back in Boston, Schilling pitched much more effectively than his last start while Carmona pitched worse. In the first inning, Boston loaded the bases with no outs.  While Manny Ramirez and David Ortiz were retired without anyone advancing, JD Drew hit a grand slam into the center field bleachers.  The crowd went crazy celebrating a 4–0 lead.  The Indians defense also played poorly and the team was beaten soundly by the Red Sox 12–2. This knotted the series at 3 and was a portent of the deciding game.

Game 7
Matsuzaka pitched well against Westbrook, fortified by an early lead. The Indians threatened to tie the game in the 7th inning when a bizarre play and an error in judgment by the third base coach left the speedy Kenny Lofton on third base and not scoring on a ball hit down the third base line and bounding out to left field.  On the very next pitch, Casey Blake hit into an inning ending double play and Boston's 3–2 lead was preserved.  In the bottom of the frame, Dustin Pedroia hit a two run homerun over the Green Monster to widen the lead at 5–2.  In the eighth, the Sox scored 6 runs to ice the game on a bases clearing double by Pedroia and a capped off by a two run homer by Kevin Youkilis.  The game had remained close until Boston broke it open on the previously reliable Rafael Betancourt, cruising to an 11–2 victory and the American League's berth in the World Series.  The final out was recorded on a great catch by Coco Crisp going to the deepest part of the triangle in center field.  The catch was the perfect exclamation point on a great comeback by Boston to go to return to the World Series.

Game log

|- style="text-align:center;background-color:#bbffbb"
| 1 || October 4 || Yankees || 12–3 || Sabathia || Wang || || 44,608 || 1–0
|- style="text-align:center;background-color:#bbffbb"
| 2 || October 5 || Yankees || 2–1 (11) || Pérez || Vizcaíno || || 44,732 || 2–0
|- style="text-align:center;background-color:#ffbbbb"
| 3 || October 7 || @ Yankees || 8–4 || Hughes || Westbrook || || 56,358 || 2–1
|- style="text-align:center;background-color:#bbffbb"
| 4 || October 8 || @ Yankees || 6–4 || Byrd || Wang || Borowski || 56,315 || 3–1

|- style="text-align:center;background-color:#ffbbbb"
| 1 || October 12 || @ Red Sox || 10–3 || Beckett || Sabathia || || 36,986 || 0–1
|- style="text-align:center;background-color:#bbffbb"
| 2 || October 13 || @ Red Sox || 13–6  || Mastny || Gagné || || 37,051 || 1–1
|- style="text-align:center;background-color:#bbffbb"
| 3 || October 15 || Red Sox || 4–2 || Westbrook || Matsuzaka || Borowski || 44,402 || 2–1
|- style="text-align:center;background-color:#bbffbb"
| 4 || October 16 || Red Sox || 7–3 || Byrd|| Wakefield || || 44,008 || 3–1
|- style="text-align:center;background-color:#ffbbbb"
| 5 || October 18 || Red Sox || 7–1 || Beckett || Sabathia || || 44,588 || 3–2
|- style="text-align:center;background-color:#ffbbbb"
| 6 || October 20 || @ Red Sox || 12–2 || Schilling || Carmona || || 37,163 || 3–3
|- style="text-align:center;background-color:#ffbbbb"
| 7 || October 21 || @ Red Sox || 11–2 || Matsuzaka || Westbrook || Papelbon || 37,165 || 3–4

Minor league affiliates

References

Game Logs:
1st Half: Cleveland Indians Game Log on ESPN.com
2nd Half: Cleveland Indians Game Log on ESPN.com
Batting Statistics: Cleveland Indians Batting Stats on ESPN.com
July 27 game statistics on ESPN.com
Pitching Statistics: Cleveland Indians Pitching Stats on ESPN.com

2007 Cleveland Indians at Baseball Reference

Cleveland Guardians seasons
Cleveland Indians season
American League Central champion seasons
Cleve